The Commission of the Yellow Rose of Texas, commonly referred to as the Yellow Rose of Texas, is an honorary commission conferred by the Governor of Texas to Texas women for exceptional community service.

History

Genesis 

The award was conceived and inaugurated by Governor Allan Shivers before the end of his second term in 1957. The Yellow Rose of Texas Commission is the highest award bestowed to women by the Texas Governor.

Etymology 

The award name, "Yellow Rose of Texas", was chosen by Governor Shivers to honor the woman known by that name, Emily Morgan, who as a 20-year-old indentured servant, according to legend, was instrumental in the victory of the Battle of San Jacinto, which, reportedly lasted 18 minutes, which, in turn, sealed the fate for Texas independence.

The Texas Rose Festival in Tyler has named a Rose Queen since its inception in 1933, and historically, the title was "Miss Yellow Rose of Texas."  In 1955, band leader Mitch Miller and His Orchestra recorded "The Yellow Rose of Texas" (the song) on Columbia Records, which became a hit.  That same year, during a ceremony in Dallas honoring Miller as an honorary Texan, Miller announced Maymerle Shirley (later known as Maymerle Brown; 1936–2017) as "Miss Yellow Rose of Texas" for 1955.

Eligibility 
The Yellow Rose of Texas recognizes exceptional community service such as: volunteerism, charitable contributions, achievements related to the preservation of the history of Texas, or achievements toward improving the present and building the future.

Recipients 
 Governor Price Daniel
 Governor John Connally
 Governor Preston Smith
 
 
 

 Governor Dolph Briscoe
 
 
 

 Governor William P. Clements
 
 
 
 

 Governor Mark White
 
 
 
 

 Governor Ann W. Richards
 
 1992: Carla McFarland of Alpine for restoration of Historic Holland Hotel and numerous volunteer activities including many tourism related board activities.
 
 
 
 
 

 Governor George W. Bush
 
 
 
 
 
 
 
 

 Governor James Richard "Rick" Perry
 
 
 
  
 
 

 
 
 
 
 
 
 
 
 
 
 
 
 
 
 
 
 
 
 
  
 
 
 
 
 

 
 
 
 
 
 
 
 
 
 
 
 

 Governor Greg Abbott
 
 
 
 
 
 
 
 
 
 
 
 
 
 
 
 
 
 
 
 
 

 
 
 
 
 
 
 
 
 
 
 
 
 November 15, 2018
 Elizabeth N Mull, San Antonio, from the Gulf Coast of Mississippi, for her work with LGBTQ youth, particularly her longtime commitment to one family, offering her support and guidance with navigating mediation of parent and child through discovery of sexual identity, gender association, depression and suicidal ideation standing by her sponsored teen through hospitalizations, suicide attempts and the suicide of sponsored teens mother and gender reassignment surgeries. Continues support of sponsored individual and other family members of individual currently to date. Also a supporter and advocate of The Trevor Project having raised $833.18 to date for the foundation.  Also recognized for her work with the San Antonio Humane Society for the volunteerism of her time , 8-10 hours every week onboarding, ,taking care of,  and in general loving the forgotten and discarded animals that find their way to SAHS. She has raised a total of $4323.36 between the National Humane Society and San Antonio Humane Society to date. Lastly,  for her work with the National Down Syndrome Society, both in Colorado Springs 2009-2012 and The Gulf Coast Down Syndrome Society 2012-present, supporting and raising money and awareness to their cause with a current amount of $3702.19 raised to date. 
Nominated by Governor of Texas Greg Abbott and Colonel Tammy Hollister, USAF. 
 
 
 
 
   
 
 
 
 
 
 
 
 
 
 
 
2020: Ingrid Wright Ortiz, San Antonio, TX, for 30 years as a Military Spouse and support to the US Army.
 2020: Enola Gay Moorman Bounds Mathews, Sulphur Springs, TX, for decades of dedication to her community through radio and print, and preservation of its legacy of western music and lifestyle through performance, memorabilia, recordings and photos 
  
 2020: Jennifer Wisniewski, Belton, TX, for service as a Military Spouse, scouting leader, and support of the 1-393 Brigade Support Battalion and the 120th Infantry Brigade, Fort Hood, TX.

 2021: Christine Del Rosario Oyler, (born 1979) El Paso, TX, for her commitment in helping not just soldiers and their families at FT Bliss but also dedicated her herself at helping the El Paso community.
2022: Cinzi Lavin, Fredericksburg, TX, musical dramatist; for exceptional charitable contributions and volunteerism, and for artistic achievements towards improving the present and building the future.
2022: Pamela Edwards Rouse Wright, Houston, TX, for her commitment and volunteerism in 35 years of service with the National Society Daughters of the American Revolution and other various lineage based and other philanthropic causes.
2022: Madi Franquiz, Dallas, TX, for her commitment to improving the present and building the future for Texas children. She has tirelessly dedicated her time and effort to better the lives of children across Texas through literacy and education, especially for underserved and underrepresented populations. 
Induction periods not known'Induction periods not known'

See also 
 Texas Women's Hall of Fame
Awards and decorations of the Texas government

References 

Lists of American women
Halls of fame in Texas
Lists of hall of fame inductees
Women's halls of fame
History of women in Texas
Awards established in 1957
Orders, decorations, and medals of Texas
Governor of Texas
Lists of people from Texas